Yukiko Anette Torun Maria Duke Bergman, (born 19 January 1966) is a Swedish translator, journalist, editor and presenter. Duke is the daughter of Christer Duke and Eiko Duke-Soei, and she specializes on Japanese and Asian society and culture in her work. She has during several years been a journalist and news reporter for Japanese television, and in later years she has presented the shows Kvällsöppet and Röda rummet which are broadcast on SVT. She is also a literature reviewer for the SVT morning show Gomorron Sverige since 1993. She has worked as a columnist for the paper Tidningen Vi and Ica Kuriren for ICA. In 2011, she became an editor for the Swedish literature paper Vi läser.

Duke has translated several Japanese books into Swedish, amongst them Haruki Murakami's novel Norwegian Wood. In 2001, her and Eiko Duke's book, Mikaku, den japanska kokboken, was nominated for the August Prize.

References

External links

Living people
1966 births
21st-century Swedish journalists
Swedish people of Japanese descent
Journalists from Stockholm